Poova Thalaiya is a 1969 Indian Tamil-language comedy film written and directed by K. Balachander. The film stars Gemini Ganesh, Jaishankar, Nagesh, S. Varalakshmi, Rajasree and Vennira Aadai Nirmala. It was released on 10 May 1969. The film was remade in Telugu as Bomma Borusa, in Malayalam as Balapareekshanam and in Kannada as Balondhu Uyyale. It was also an influence on Kandha Kadamba Kathir Vela.

Plot 

Ganesan is a widower and Parvathamma is his mother-in-law. Shankar is the younger brother of  Ganesan and he falls in love with Parvathamma's youngest daughter Nirmala. A healthy competition takes place between evil minded Parvathamma and Shankar so as to overthrow one another.

Cast 
 Gemini Ganesh as Ganesan
 Jaishankar as Shankar
 Nagesh as Nagesh
 Srikanth as Nagamma's son
 M. R. R. Vasu as the hotel manager
 S. Rama Rao as Indra's father
 J. Balayya
 S. Varalakshmi as Parvathamma
 Rajasree as Raji
 Vennira Aadai Nirmala as Nirmala
 Manorama as Indra
 Sachu as Saraswathy
 T. P. Muthulakshmi as Nagamma
 Parvathy as Indra's mother

Production 
The film was shot at AVM Studios and was produced by Rama Arangannal, an active politician.

Soundtrack 
The music was composed by M. S. Viswanathan, with lyrics by Vaali. The title song is set to the raga Mohanam, and "Maduraiyil Parandha" is set to Kalyani.

Release and reception 
Poova Thalaiya was released on 10 May 1969. The Indian Express called the film "an all-out attempt at comedy and it succeeds reasonably well", but said Balachander's direction had "not come up with the standard of his previous films".

References

Bibliography

External links 
 

1960s Tamil-language films
1969 comedy films
1969 films
Films directed by K. Balachander
Films scored by M. S. Viswanathan
Films shot in Tirunelveli
Films with screenplays by K. Balachander
Indian black-and-white films
Indian comedy films
Tamil films remade in other languages